The Armenian Internet Company, known simply as Arminco, is the first major commercial internet service provider (ISP) in Armenia, established in 1992. Arminco provides a wide range of internet services including Internet connectivity, data connectivity, via its fiber optical backbone, which covers the whole capital, DSL, and Wi-Fi connectivity, VoIP etc. throughout Yerevan and the provinces, or marzer.

See also 
 Internet in Armenia

External links 
 Arminco website

Telecommunications companies of Armenia
Internet service providers of Armenia